Reginald Maurice Phillips (19 October 1897 – 7 June 1964) was a Welsh cricketer. Phillips' batting and bowling styles are unknown. He was born in Monmouth, Monmouthshire. He was the son of brewer Fred Phillips, who was at the time the managing director of Phillips & Sons Brewery.

Phillips made his debut for Monmouthshire against the Surrey Second XI in the 1921 County Championship. He played Minor counties cricket for Monmouthshire from 1921 to 1934, making 19 appearances. During this period he made a single first-class appearance for Wales against the Marylebone Cricket Club in 1925. He scored 11 runs in the Welsh first-innings before being dismissed by Joseph North, while in the second-innings he was dismissed for 2 runs by Jack Hearne.

Despite coming from a family which ran a brewery, Phillips appears to have shown little interest in the business. He died in Budleigh Salterton, Devon, England on 7 June 1964.

References

External links
Reginald Phillips at ESPNcricinfo
Reginald Phillips at CricketArchive

1897 births
1963 deaths
Sportspeople from Monmouth, Wales
Cricketers from Monmouthshire
English cricketers
Monmouthshire cricketers
Wales cricketers